Grant Anderson (born 13 September 1989) is an English rugby union who played for Northampton Saints in the Guinness Premiership.

He plays as a centre or wing.

References

External links
 Northampton Saints profile

1989 births
Living people
English rugby union players
Northampton Saints players
Rugby union centres
Rugby union wings